Zolotonozhka is a rural locality (a selo) in Zolotonozhsky Selsoviet of Konstantinovsky District, Amur Oblast, Russia. The population was 224 as of 2018. There are 3 streets.

Geography 
Zolotonozhka is located 48 km northeast of Konstantinovka (the district's administrative centre) by road. Zenkovka is the nearest rural locality.

References 

Rural localities in Konstantinovsky District